South Avenue Commercial Historic District is a national historic district located in Springfield, Missouri, United States. The district encompasses 10 contributing buildings in a commercial section of Springfield. The district developed between about 1895 and 1949, and it includes representative examples of Italianate and Colonial Revival style architecture.  Notable buildings include the Medical Arts Building (1929) and Springfield Life Building/Savoy Hotel/Hotel Seville (c. 1906, 1928).

It was added to the National Register of Historic Places in 1999.

References

Historic districts on the National Register of Historic Places in Missouri
Italianate architecture in Missouri
Colonial Revival architecture in Missouri
Buildings and structures in Springfield, Missouri
National Register of Historic Places in Greene County, Missouri